Wahda (وحدة) or Al-Wahda also Al-Wehda (الوحدة "the unity") may refer to:

 Unity (state), a state of South Sudan
 Al Wahda (newspaper), an Emirati daily
 Al Wahda FC, a football club based in Abu Dhabi, United Arab Emirates
 Al-Wahda SC (Oman), a football club based in Sur, Oman
 Al-Wahda SC (Syria), a football and basketball club based in Damascus, Syria
Al Wahda (men's basketball), basketball club in Syria
 Al-Wahda SC (Tripoli), a football club based in Tripoli, Libya
 Al Wehda FC, a football club based in Mecca, Saudi Arabia
 Al-Wehda SCC (Sanaa), a football club based in Sana'a, Yemen
 Al-Wehda SC (Aden), a football club based in Aden, Yemen
 Al-Wehdat SC, a football club based in Amman, Jordan